Michael Frederick Thomas Hickman (born 2 October 1946) is an English former professional footballer who played as a forward.

References

1946 births
Living people
People from Surrey (before 1965)
English footballers
Association football forwards
Brighton & Hove Albion F.C. players
Grimsby Town F.C. players
Blackburn Rovers F.C. players
Torquay United F.C. players
English Football League players